Joseph Ronald Kinsey (28 August 1921 – 7 July 1983) was a Conservative politician in the United Kingdom.

Kinsey was a florist. He was a councillor on Birmingham City Council from 1955.

Kinsey first contested Birmingham Aston. He was Member of Parliament for Birmingham Perry Barr from 1970 until his defeat at the February 1974 general election, when he lost the seat to Labour candidate Jeff Rooker.

References 
Times Guide to the House of Commons October 1974

External links 
 

1921 births
1983 deaths
Conservative Party (UK) MPs for English constituencies
UK MPs 1970–1974
Councillors in Birmingham, West Midlands